Fredrick Monroe Taylor (February 25, 1901 – February 16, 1988) was a United States district judge of the United States District Court for the District of Idaho.

Education and career
Born in Nampa, Idaho, Taylor graduated from Nampa High School and attended the University of Idaho in Moscow. He was a member of Sigma Nu fraternity and received a Bachelor of Laws from the University of Idaho College of Law in 1926. Taylor was in private practice in Valley County, Idaho from 1927 to 1938, and a prosecuting attorney of Valley County from 1927 to 1933, and from 1935 to 1938, returning to private practice in Boise, Idaho from 1938 to 1954. He was a member of the Idaho Senate from 1943 to 1951, and was city attorney of Boise from 1944 to 1946. Taylor was the campaign manager for Herman Welker in 1950, who was elected to the United States Senate.

Federal judicial service
Taylor was nominated by President Dwight D. Eisenhower on July 9, 1954, to the United States District Court for the District of Idaho, to a new seat authorized by 68 Stat. 8. He was confirmed by the United States Senate on July 20, 1954, and received his commission the same day. He served as Chief Judge from 1964 to 1971. He was a member of the Judicial Conference of the United States from 1969 to 1972. He assumed senior status on December 15, 1971. His service terminated on February 16, 1988, due to his death.

Notable case
During his tenure, Taylor was in the majority for the 1975 case Warren Jones Co. v. Commissioner.

References

External links
 
 

Judges of the United States District Court for the District of Idaho
United States district court judges appointed by Dwight D. Eisenhower
20th-century American judges
Republican Party Idaho state senators
University of Idaho alumni
Idaho lawyers
American prosecutors
20th-century American lawyers
People from Nampa, Idaho
1901 births
1988 deaths
People from Valley County, Idaho
University of Idaho College of Law alumni
20th-century American politicians